Blue Chairs Resort by the Sea (often simply Blue Chairs or sometimes Blue Chairs Beach Club), is an LGBT-friendly hotel in Puerto Vallarta's Zona Romántica, in the Mexican state of Jalisco. The property has a rooftop bar called Blue Sunset Rooftop Bar.

The beach in front of the hotel, the southern segment of Playa de los Muertos, is sometimes referred to as "Blue Chairs Beach". Blue Chairs Beach has been described as the "unofficially gay" portion of Playa de Los Muertos.

The hotel has hosted the Vallarta Pride Fashion Show.

References

External links

 
 

Hotels in Mexico
LGBT culture in Mexico
Zona Romántica